Clover is an unincorporated community in Clermont County, in the U.S. state of Ohio.

History
A post office called Clover was established in 1847, and remained in operation until 1863. Besides the post office, Clover had a country store and the Clover church, from which the town took its name.

References

Unincorporated communities in Clermont County, Ohio
Unincorporated communities in Ohio